Eshkavand (also Romanized as Eshkāvand and Ashkāvand; also known as ‘Āsheqvān, ‘Ishqwān, and Qal‘eh-ye Mardān) is a village in Keraj Rural District, in the Central District of Isfahan County, Isfahan Province, Iran. At the 2006 census, its population was 2,557, in 699 families.

References 

Populated places in Isfahan County